The Ministry of Science and Technology is the Indian government ministry charged with formulation and administration of the rules and regulations and laws relating to science and technology in India.

Organisation
The ministry includes the following departments:

Department of Biotechnology

Autonomous Institutes

National Institute of Immunology, Delhi
National Centre for Cell Science (NCCS), Pune, Maharashtra (formerly National Facility for Animal Tissue and Cell Culture, NFATCC)
National Brain Research Centre (NBRC), Manesar, Haryana
Kalam Institute of Health Technology, Visakhapatnam, Andhra Pradesh
Centre for DNA Fingerprinting & Diagnostics (CDFD), Hyderabad, Telangana
Institute of Bioresources and Sustainable Development (IBSD), Imphal, Manipur
National Institute Of Plant Genome Research, Delhi
Institute of Stem Cell Biology and Regenerative Medicine Bangalore.
Institute of Life Sciences, Bhubaneshwar, Odisha
Rajiv Gandhi Centre for Biotechnology, Thiruvananthapuram, Kerala
Translational Health Science & Technology Institute, Faridabad, Haryana
National Institute of Animal Biotechnology, Hyderabad, Telangana
Public Sector Undertakings

Bharat Immunologicals and Biologicals Corporation Limited (BIBCOL), Bulandshahar, Uttar Pradesh
Indian Vaccine Corporation Limited, Delhi

Department of Scientific and Industrial Research 
Technology Promotion, Development and Utilization Programme (TPDU)
Industrial R&D Promotion Programme (IRDPP)
Technology Development and Innovation Programme (TDIP)
Technology Development and Demonstration Programme (TDDP)
Technopreneur Promotion Programme (TePP)
Technology Management Programme (TMP)
International Technology Transfer Programme (ITTP)
Consultancy Promotion Programme (CCP)
Technology Information Facilitation Programme (TIFP)
Technology Development Utilization Programme for Women (TDUPW)
Autonomous institutions
Consultancy Development Centre (CDC)
Council of Scientific and Industrial Research (CSIR)
Public sector enterprises
National Research Development Corporation (NRDC)
Central Electronics Limited (CEL)
Asian and Pacific Centre for Transfer of Technology (APCTT)
Administration
Finance

Department of Science and Technology 

Technology Information, Forecasting and Assessment Council (TIFAC)
Vigyan Prasar
National Accreditation Board for Testing and Calibration Laboratories (NABL) 
National Atlas and Thematic Mapping Organisation (NATMO), Calcutta
Survey of India, Dehradun
IISc
IISERs
Institute of Nano Science and Technology
Sree Chitra Tirunal Institute for Medical Sciences and Technology, Trivandrum

List of ministers
The Minister of Science and Technology is the head of the ministry. It is a key office in the Union Cabinet.

List of Ministers of State

See also
 Ministry of Earth Sciences (India)

Notes

External links

 Department of Science & Technology

 
1971 establishments in Delhi
Government agencies established in 1971
Science